Palazzo del Capitano  is a Gothic architecture, late 13th-century civic palace in Todi, Italy.

Palaces in Umbria
Buildings and structures in Todi
Gothic architecture in Todi